The index of physics articles is split into multiple pages due to its size.

To navigate by individual letter use the table of contents below.

T

Τ–θ puzzle
T-15 (reactor)
T-J model
T-duality
T-symmetry
T. H. Laby
T. Neil Davis
T. V. Ramakrishnan
T2K experiment
TAMA 300
TASSO
TEA laser
Terahertz radiation
TINKER
TORRO scale
TOTEM
TRACER (cosmic ray detector)
TRIGA
Troitsk Institute of Innovative and Thermonuclear Research
TRIUMF
T meson
Ta-You Wu
Table of nuclides
Table of radioactive decay
Table of thermodynamic equations
Tachyon
Tachyon condensation
Tachyonic antitelephone
Tachyonic field
Tacoma Narrows Bridge (1940)
Tadeusz Banachiewicz
Tadpole (physics)
Tai Tsun Wu
Tailless aircraft
Tailwind
Tait equation
Takahiko Yamanouchi
Takens' theorem
Taketani Mitsuo
Taksu Cheon
Talbot cavity
Tamiaki Yoneya
Tandem Accelerator Superconducting Cyclotron
Tandem Van de Graaff
Tangent modulus
Tangent stiffness matrix
Tangloids
Tanjore Ramachandra Anantharaman
Tanya Atwater
Target strength
Tatyana Sapunova
Tau (particle)
Tau neutrino
Taub-NUT vacuum
Tauonium
Taylor column
Taylor cone
Taylor dispersion
Taylor microscale
Taylor number
Taylor state
Taylor vortex
Taylor–Couette flow
Taylor–Goldstein equation
Taylor–Green vortex
Taylor–Proudman theorem
Tea leaf paradox
Tears of wine
Technetium-99m
Technetium-99m generator
Technical atmosphere
Technical report
Technicolor (physics)
Technological applications of superconductivity
Tecplot
Tectonophysics
Tectonophysics (journal)
Ted Jacobson
Ted Taylor (physicist)
Tekin Dereli
Teleforce
Telegeodynamics
Teleidoscope
Teleparallelism
Telescope
Telescope Array Project
Telescoping (mechanics)
Telluric current
Teltron tube
Temistocle Calzecchi-Onesti
Temperature
Temperature coefficient
Temperature control
Temperature dependence of liquid viscosity
Temperature measurement
Temperature–entropy diagram
Temporal paradox
Tendex line
Tennis racket theorem
Tensile stress
Tensiometer (surface tension)
Tension (physics)
Tensometer
Tensor
Tensor calculus
Tensor density
Tensor field
Tensors in curvilinear coordinates
Tensor–vector–scalar gravity
Tephigram
Terahertz band
Terahertz metamaterials
Terahertz radiation
Terahertz spectroscopy
Terence Quinn
Term symbol
Terminal velocity
Termination shock
Terminator (solar)
Terrell rotation
Terrella
Terrestrial Physics
Terrestrial gamma-ray flash
Terrestrial reference frame
Terrestrial stationary waves
Tesla (unit)
Tesla coil
Tesla turbine
Tessaleno Devezas
Test charge
Test particle
Test theories of special relativity
Tests of electromagnetism
Tests of general relativity
Tests of relativistic energy and momentum
Tests of special relativity
Tetrad formalism
Tetrads in general relativity
Tetragonal crystal system
Tetraneutron
Tetraquark
Tevatron
Tevian Dray
Textile-reinforced materials
Texture (cosmology)
Texture (crystalline)
Thales
Thanu Padmanabhan
The Astronomy and Astrophysics Review
The Astrophysical Journal
The Beginning of Infinity
The Black Hole War
The Character of Physical Law
The Continuing Revolution
The Cosmic Landscape
The Dancing Wu Li Masters
The Electrician
The Elegant Universe
The Emperor's New Mind
The End of Time (book)
The Evolution of Physics
The Fabric of Reality
The Fabric of the Cosmos
The Feynman Lectures on Physics
The First Three Minutes: A Modern View of the Origin of the Universe
The Fly in the Cathedral
The Flying Circus of Physics
The God Particle: If the Universe Is the Answer, What Is the Question?
The Grand Design (book)
The Hidden Reality: Parallel Universes and the Deep Laws of the Cosmos
The Hubble Limit
The Hum
The Internet Pilot to Physics
The Journal of Lightwave Technology
The Large, the Small and the Human Mind
The Large Scale Structure of Space-Time
The Laws of Physics
The Left Hand of the Electron
The Meaning of It All
The Monkey and the Hunter
The Nature of Space and Time
The Physicists
The Physics Teacher
The Physics of Basketball
The Physics of Blown Sand and Desert Dunes
The Physics of Star Trek
The Physics of Superheroes
The Quantum Universe
The Radiation Belt and Magnetosphere
The Road to Reality
The Strangest Man
The Tao of Physics
The Trouble with Physics
The Universe in a Nutshell
The Unreasonable Effectiveness of Mathematics in the Natural Sciences
The Value of Science
The Wigner Medal
The World (Descartes)
The World as I See It (book)
The gadget
Theo Geisel (physicist)
Theodor Kaluza
Theodor Rehbock
Theodor W. Hänsch
Theodor Wulf
Theodore Lyman
Theodore Maiman
Theodore Postol
Theodore Theodorsen
Theodore William Richards
Theodore Y. Wu
Theodore von Kármán
Theodoric of Freiberg
Theophrastus
Theorem of corresponding states
Theoretical Advanced Study Institute
Theoretical and Mathematical Physics
Theoretical and experimental justification for the Schrödinger equation
Theoretical astrophysics
Theoretical gravity
Theoretical motivation for general relativity
Theoretical physics
Theoretical planetology
Theories of cloaking
Theory and Phenomena of Metamaterials
Theory of Colours
Theory of everything
Theory of heat
Theory of relativity
Theory of tides
There's Plenty of Room at the Bottom
Thermal
Thermal Hall effect
Thermal airship
Thermal analysis
Thermal bar
Thermal bath (thermodynamics)
Thermal blooming
Thermal conductance quantum
Thermal conduction
Thermal conductivity
Thermal contact
Thermal contact conductance
Thermal de Broglie wavelength
Thermal diffusivity
Thermal diode
Thermal effective mass
Thermal efficiency
Thermal energy
Thermal energy storage
Thermal expansion
Thermal fluctuations
Thermal fluids
Thermal flywheel effect
Thermal hydraulics
Thermal inertia
Thermal insulation
Thermal ionization
Thermal ionization mass spectrometry
Thermal laser stimulation
Thermal light
Thermal loop
Thermal mass
Thermal motion
Thermal properties of nanostructures
Thermal quantum field theory
Thermal radiation
Thermal reservoir
Thermal resistance
Thermal science
Thermal simulations for Integrated Circuits
Thermal transmittance
Thermal velocity
Thermalisation
Thermally stimulated current spectroscopy
Thermionic emission
Thermionics
Thermistor
Thermo-dielectric effect
Thermo-migration
Thermoacoustic heat engine
Thermoacoustics
Thermochromism
Thermocouple
Thermodynamic beta
Thermodynamic cycle
Thermodynamic diagrams
Thermodynamic efficiency
Thermodynamic equations
Thermodynamic equilibrium
Thermodynamic free energy
Thermodynamic instruments
Thermodynamic length
Thermodynamic limit
Thermodynamic potential
Thermodynamic process
Thermodynamic pump testing
Thermodynamic square
Thermodynamic state
Thermodynamic system
Thermodynamic temperature
Thermodynamic variable
Thermodynamicist
Thermodynamics
Thermoeconomics
Thermoelectric cooling
Thermoelectric effect
Thermoelectric materials
Thermography
Thermogravimetric analysis
Thermoluminescence
Thermoluminescent Dosimeter
Thermomagnetic convection
Thermomechanical analysis
Thermometer
Thermomigration
Thermonuclear weapon
Thermophoresis
Thermophotonics
Thermophotovoltaic
Thermoporometry and cryoporometry
Thermoremanence
Thermoremanent magnetization
Thermosiphon
Thermotropic crystal
Thermotunnel cooling
Theta meson
Theta vacuum
Thibault Damour
Thin-film bulk acoustic resonator
Thin-film interference
Thin-film optics
Thin Man (nuclear bomb)
Thin Solid Films
Thin lens
Third Cambridge Catalogue of Radio Sources
Third law of thermodynamics
Thirring model
Thirring–Wess model
Thixotropy
Thomas-François Dalibard
Thomas Allibone
Thomas Bradwardine
Thomas C. Hanks
Thomas Chrowder Chamberlin
Thomas Corwin Mendenhall
Thomas Curtright
Thomas Dale Stewart
Thomas Dale Stewart (physicist)
Thomas Ebbesen
Thomas Eckersley
Thomas Eugene Everhart
Thomas F Krauss
Thomas Fincke
Thomas G. Barnes
Thomas Godfrey (inventor)
Thomas Gold
Thomas Grubb
Thomas Guidott
Thomas H. Stix
Thomas J. Ahrens
Thomas J. Bowles (physicist)
Thomas J. Parmley
Thomas Jefferson National Accelerator Facility
Thomas Johann Seebeck
Thomas M. Baer
Thomas Parnell (scientist)
Thomas Preston (scientist)
Thomas Ralph Merton
Thomas Rockwell Mackie
Thomas S. Lundgren
Thomas Spencer (mathematical physicist)
Thomas T. Goldsmith, Jr.
Thomas Timusk
Thomas Townsend Brown
Thomas Young (scientist)
Thomas Ypsilantis
Thomas precession
Thomas–Fermi model
Thomson (unit)
Thomson Experiment
Thomson Reuters Citation Laureates
Thomson problem
Thomson scattering
Thor Rhodin
Thorne–Hawking–Preskill bet
Thorne–Żytkow object
Thouless energy
Three-body force
Three-phase
Three Roads to Quantum Gravity
Three jet event
Threshold energy
Throttling process
Throttling process (thermodynamics)
Thrust
Thrust reversal
Thunder
Théophile de Donder
Thévenin's theorem
Ti-sapphire laser
Tiberius Cavallo
Tidal acceleration
Tidal atlas
Tidal bore
Tidal diamond
Tidal force
Tidal power
Tidal race
Tidal range
Tidal resonance
Tidal tensor
Tide
Tide table
Tideline
Tight binding
Tihomir Novakov
Tilt (optics)
Tim Pedley
Timaeus (dialogue)
Time
Time-dependent density functional theory
Time-evolving block decimation
Time constant
Time derivative
Time dilation
Time evolution
Time evolution of integrals
Time in physics
Time loop
Time of flight
Time of flight detector
Time projection chamber
Time stream
Time travel
Timelike congruence
Timelike homotopy
Timelike simply connected
Timeline of Solar System astronomy
Timeline of astronomical maps, catalogs, and surveys
Timeline of atomic and subatomic physics
Timeline of black hole physics
Timeline of carbon nanotubes
Timeline of chemical elements discoveries
Timeline of classical mechanics
Timeline of cosmic microwave background astronomy
Timeline of cosmological theories
Timeline of discovery of Solar System planets and their moons
Timeline of electromagnetic theory
Timeline of electromagnetism and classical optics
Timeline of fundamental physics discoveries
Timeline of gravitational physics and relativity
Timeline of knowledge about galaxies, clusters of galaxies, and large-scale structure
Timeline of luminiferous aether
Timeline of nuclear fusion
Timeline of particle discoveries
Timeline of particle physics
Timeline of particle physics technology
Timeline of quantum mechanics
Timeline of states of matter and phase transitions
Timeline of temperature and pressure measurement technology
Timeline of the Manhattan Project
Timeline of the far future
Timeline of thermodynamics
Timoshenko Medal
Timothy Hampton
Timothy Schrabback
Tim Sumner (physicist)
Tingye Li
Tiny ionospheric photometer
Tipler cylinder
Tippe top
Tipping point (physics)
Tired light
ToFeT
Tod R. Lauer
Toda field theory
Tokamak
Tokamak Fusion Test Reactor
Tokamak de Fontenay aux Roses
Tokamak à configuration variable
Tollmien–Schlichting wave
Tolman length
Tolman–Oppenheimer–Volkoff equation
Tolman–Oppenheimer–Volkoff limit
Tom Abel
Tom Baehr-Jones
Tom Banks (physicist)
Tom Lubensky
Tom W. B. Kibble
Tom W. Bonner Prize in Nuclear Physics
Tomalla Foundation
Tomlinson model
Tomographic reconstruction
Tomography
Tone hole
Tonks–Girardeau gas
Tonpilz
Tony Hey
Tony Skyrme
Top Lambda baryon
Top eta meson
Top quark
Top quark condensate
Topcolor
Topness
Topogravitic tensor
Topological censorship
Topological conjugacy
Topological defect
Topological degeneracy
Topological entropy
Topological entropy in physics
Topological order
Topological quantum computer
Topological quantum number
Topological string theory
Toponium
Tor Hagfors
Torahiko Terada
Torbjørn Digernes
Tore Supra
Toric lens
Tornado
Toroidal reflector
Toroidal ring model
Torque
Torque density
Torricelli's equation
Torricelli's law
Torsion (mechanics)
Torsion coefficient
Torsion field (pseudoscience)
Torsion spring
Toshihide Maskawa
Total air temperature
Total angular momentum quantum number
Total derivative
Total dynamic head
Total effective dose equivalent
Total external reflection
Total internal reflection
Total internal reflection fluorescence microscope
Total pressure
Total refraction
Total variation diminishing
Totalitarian principle
Toughness
Townsend (unit)
Townsend coefficient
Toy model
Trace-free Ricci tensor
Trace distance
Track Imaging Cherenkov Experiment
Tracking (particle physics)
Tracy Hall
Trailing edge
Train noise
Trajectory
Trajectory optimization
Trans-Planckian problem
Transactional interpretation
Transduction (biophysics)
Transfer-matrix method
Transfer-matrix method (optics)
Transfer operator
Transfermium Wars
Transformation optics
Transformation theory (quantum mechanics)
Transformer effect
Transient equilibrium
Transient flow
Transient friction loading
Transistor
Transition Dipole Moment
Transition boiling
Transition dipole moment
Transition edge sensor
Transition of state
Transition point
Transition radiation
Transition radiation detector
Transition radiation tracker
Transition rule
Translation (physics)
Translational kinematics
Translational lift
Translational partition function
Translational symmetry
Transmission-line
Transmission (mechanics)
Transmission coefficient
Transmission coefficient (optics)
Transmission electron microscopy
Transmission electron microscopy DNA sequencing
Transmission line measurement
Transmission medium
Transmissometer
Transmittance
Transmitter power output
Transmon
Transonic
Transonic speed
Transparency and translucency
Transparent ceramics
Transparent conducting film
Transport length
Transport phenomena
Transport phenomena (engineering & physics)
Transuranic waste
Transverse Doppler effect
Transverse flow effect
Transverse isotropy
Transverse mass
Transverse mode
Transverse relaxation optimized spectroscopy
Transverse wave
Trapezoidal wing
Trapped ion quantum computer
Trapped null surface
Traveling wave reactor
Treatise on Natural Philosophy
Trefftz plane
Trench effect
Tribimaximal mixing
Triboelectric effect
Tribology
Triboluminescence
Triclinic crystal system
Trident laser
Trigger (particle physics)
Trigonal crystal system
Trihydrogen cation
Trim tab
Trimaximal mixing
Trinh Xuan Thuan
Trinification
Trinity (nuclear test)
Trion (physics)
Triple-alpha process
Triple-resonance nuclear magnetic resonance spectroscopy
Triple point
Triple product rule
Triplet lens
Triplet state
Trisonic wind tunnel
Trisops
Tritiated water
Tritium
Trojan wave packet
Troland
Tropical cyclone
Tropical cyclone scales
Tropospheric scatter
Trotec
Trouton's constant
Trouton's ratio
Trouton's ratio (rheology)
Trouton–Noble experiment
Trouton–Rankine experiment
Troy ounce
True anomaly
Truss
Trygve Røed-Larsen
Tsallis entropy
Tsiolkovsky rocket equation
Tsirelson's bound
Tsunami
Tsunami warning system
Tsung-Dao Lee
Tullio Levi-Civita
Tullio Regge
Tunable laser
Tunable metamaterials
Tunable microwave device
Tunnel injection
Tunnel ionization
Tunnel junction
Tunnel magnetoresistance
Turbidimetry
Turbidity
Turbidity current
Turbidometry
Turboexpander
Turbophoresis
Turbulator
Turbulence
Turbulence kinetic energy
Turbulence modeling
Turbulent Prandtl number
Turbulent jet breakup
Turgay Uzer
Tuva or Bust!
Twin Quasar
Twin paradox
Twisted nematic field effect
Twisted sector
Twistor space
Twistor theory
Two-balloon experiment
Two-body Dirac equations
Two-body problem
Two-body problem in general relativity
Two-color system
Two-dimensional gas
Two-dimensional nuclear magnetic resonance spectroscopy
Two-dimensional point vortex gas
Two-phase flow
Two-photon absorption
Two-photon physics
Two-state quantum system
Two-stream instability
Two New Sciences
Twyman–Green interferometer
Tyndall effect
Type-1.5 superconductor
Type-II superconductor
Type-I superconductor
Type 0 string theory
Type II string theory
Type II supernova
Type I Cepheid
Type I Cepheids
Type I string theory
Type Ia supernova
Type Ib and Ic supernovae

Indexes of physics articles